1 Little Shambles is an historic building in the English city of York, North Yorkshire. A Grade II listed building, it adjoins the rear of 41–42 Shambles and faces Shambles Market.

A former house, dating to the 15th century, it was restored around 1950. It is timber-framed, with the ground floor walls made of orange-red brick in English garden-wall bond. Its upper floors are rendered. It has a pantile roof with a brick chimney stack.

There are two doors on the Little Shambles elevation: one for the ground floor and one for the upper floors. As of 2023, the building is occupied by Parlormade Café and Scone House.

References 

Houses in North Yorkshire
15th-century establishments in England
Grade II listed buildings in York
Grade II listed houses
15th century in York